Pourudu is a 2008 Telugu language action drama film written and directed by Raj Aditya. The film stars Sumanth and Kajal Aggarwal, while Suman, Nassar, Brahmanandam, Ali, Subbaraju, and Kota Srinivasa Rao play supporting roles. The film was produced by Sumanth's sister, Supriya, under the S.S Creations / Annapurna Studios banner. The music score was by Mani Sharma with cinematography by Sudhakar Yekkanti. The film released on 13 January 2008. It was a moderate success at the box office, having a run of 100 days in a couple of centers. The film was later dubbed into Hindi as Giraftaar: The Man on a Mission in 2008.

Plot
Ajay completes his college degree and prepares for the IAS examination. His father Pandu works as a right hand under a powerful mafia leader named Jakeer Bhai. Kasi runs a rival gang in the same city along with his son. Though Pandu is a gangster, his son Ajay has different and more law-abiding aspirations. He concentrates on his studies and completes his IPS preliminaries. At the same time, he is a martial arts expert. Although he does not agree with his father's allegiance to Jakeer Bhai and the criminal world, he still loves him. Ajay and Samyukta, a student at a dance school, fall in love. At this juncture, Hussain takes charge as a CI and tries to nab Jakeer Bhai, Pandu, and Kasi. Unfortunately, he is not able to do so because of their political influence. In an ensuing conflict between Pandu and Kasi's son, the former's life is in danger. Knowing this, Ajay gets involved in the fight and saves his father. Hussain arrests both Pandu and Ajay subsequently. Pandu later learns that Jakeer Bhai is more evil than he is pretending to be and decides to leave him. Not liking this, Jakeer Bhai has Pandu killed by Kasi and his son. Jakeer Bhai wants to control the city, so he asks Ajay to kill Kasi and his son. Ajay then quits his ambition to become an IAS officer to avenge his father's death. In the end, he kills Jakeer Bhai. Hussain makes everyone believe that all those who are killed by Ajay died in a mafia gang war. He then helps Ajay attend the IAS main exams as he wishes. The film ends with the reunion of Samyukta and Ajay.

Cast

 Sumanth as Ajay
 Kajal Aggarwal as Samyukta
 Suman as Pandu
 Nassar as Jakeer Bhai
 Brahmanandam as Church Father
 Ali as Madame Sir
 Subbaraju as Hussain
 Kota Srinivasa Rao as Kasi
 Dharmavarapu Subramanyam as Samyukta's father
 Pragathi as Samyukta's mother
 Raghu Babu as Mastan
 Srinivasa Reddy 
 Sunil as Samyukta's prospective groom
 Ahuti Prasad
 Vamsi Krishna
 M. S. Narayana
 Suman Setty

Reception
Jeevi of idlebrain.com gave a review with a rating 3/5, stating "Though there are dialogues justifying the title Pourudu, it is a pure personal revenge story of a Koduku. On the whole, a better climax and good fight sequences make Pourudu an average flick." telugucinema.com gave a review of rating 3/5 stating "Pourudu is a regular action drama. Sumanth scores as actor but he is dogged down by the poor script. It fails to impress as its second half is too boring." Oneindia Entertainment gave a review stating "the storyline is not too impressive, it is just a time pass film. Sumanth, is able to achieve his idea, of reverting his image from a soft and family hero to an action hero. The storyline is based on the theme – When society fails, power will rise, when power fails, a man will rise. It is an okay film for those who like an average action movie. One more time pass film for this Sankranthi." IndiaGlitz gave a review, stating Pourudu' is not your usual masala mix. But if you like something simple, then try it. Be warned though, it gets a tad too bland at times." Sify.com gave a review, stating "Sumanth, who proved his mettle for the first time onscreen with Satyam couldn't repeat the magic this time. As an action hero, he succeeds to a certain , but the film is bogged down by the beaten to death plot line of a son taking avenge on the killers of his father." Rediff.com gave a review stating "Even though the film has an interesting premise (the tagline reads, 'when the system fails a power will rise, when that power fails, a man will rise'), it fails to live up to the expectations."

Soundtrack

The music launch of this film was done in a silent way at Annapurna studios on the night of 27 December 2007. ANR launched the audio and gave the cassette to D Rama Naidu. This function was held without any speeches. ANR, Nagarjuna, Sumanth, Kajal Agarwal, D Suresh Babu Kota, Suman, Akkineni Venkat attended this function.

References

External links 
 

2008 films
Films scored by Mani Sharma
2000s Telugu-language films
2008 action drama films
2000s masala films
Indian action drama films